Tolpia indiai is a moth of the family Erebidae first described by Michael Fibiger in 2007. It is known from the Nilgiri Mountains of India.

The wingspan is about 15 mm. The hindwing is dark brown and the underside unicolorous brown.

References

Micronoctuini
Taxa named by Michael Fibiger
Moths described in 2007